{

Glossophyllum is an extinct genus of leaves known from the Triassic of Eurasia, with affinities to Ginkgoales. The leaves are elongate relative to modern Ginkgo, being lanceolate, strap or tongue shaped.

Description 
The leaves of Glossophyllum have parallel veins, and are either lanceolate, tongue, or strap shaped. The cuticle is typically thick and amphistomatic (stomata present on both sides of the leaf). The largest species, Glossophyllum shensiense reached a maximum length of 50 cm and a width of 6 cm.

Taxonomy 
Glossophyllum was initially named by Richard Kräusel in 1943 based on the species Glossophyllum florinii, which was described from the Late Triassic (Carnian) of Linz, Austria. It is assigned to the Ginkgoales due to the similarity of the epidermis to members of that order, as well as the characteristic two veins at the leaf base. Glossophyllum was proposed to be replaced by Arberophyllum by Doweld in 2000, due to the previous use of Glossophyllum for bryophytes in the 19th century. However, this proposal not been widely accepted by paleobotanists.

Species 
After Sun et al. 2022

 Glossophyllum angustifolium Stanislavsky, 1976 Donbass Basin, Ukraine, Late Triassic
 Glossophyllum claviforme Mogucheva, 1973 Tungus Basin, Siberia, Russia, Early Triassic
 Glossophyllum ereminae Sixtel, 1962 Madygen Flora, Central Asia, Middle-Late Triassic  
 Glossophyllum florinii Kräusel, 1943 (type) Austria, China, Late Triassic
 Glossophyllum lanceolatum Sun et Deng China, Late Triassic
 Glossophyllum oblanceolatum Sixtel, 1962 Madygen Flora, Central Asia, Middle-Late Triassic
 Glossophyllum panii Sun et Deng China, Late Triassic
 Glossophyllum shensiense (Sze) Sun et Deng emend, China, Late Triassic
 Glossophyllum spathulatum Taymyr Peninsula, Russia, Late Triassic
 Glossophyllum spetsbergensis Svalbard, Norway, Late Triassic
 Glossophyllum substrictum Pott Svalbard, Norway, Late Triassic
 Glossophyllum zeilleri Vietnam, China, Late Triassic

References 

Triassic plants
Ginkgophyta
Prehistoric plant genera